Hiroshima: In Memoriam and Today is a collection of stories of survivors of the atomic bombing of Hiroshima on August 6, 1945. It was edited by Hitoshi Takayama. It also contains a number of opinions and messages from world leaders including Pope John Paul II, Australian Prime Ministers Gough Whitlam and Malcolm Fraser, South African President F.W. de Klerk and UN Secretary General Kurt Waldheim.  It was first published in 1969 and 1971 as Hiroshima: In Memoriam and then republished in 1973, 1975, 1979, 1982 and 2000 under the current title.

Structure
Part One: The Hiroshima Experience 50 Years Later

Chapter 1: Memoirs of A-bomb survivors
 Confession of a Korean-born Japanese Survivor - Eiichi Hashimoto
 Burned, and Burned Again: How the A-bomb Changed My Life - Sunao Tsuboi
 The Importance of Telling What Happened - Suzuko Numata
 The Monster - Tamotsu Eguchi
 Witnessing to A-bomb Terror - Akihiro Takahashi 
 Cherishing the Life My Mother Gave Me - Michiko Yamaoka
 Let There Be Kindness and Peace: What I learned from My Ordeal - Fukujun Kaku
 A Prayer for Second-generation Survivors - Masahiro Yoshioka
 The Survivors Mission, 50 Years Later - Takeshi Itoh 
 Love Triumphs Over Power: The Rule Of Life - Ichiro Moritaki

Chapter 2: Concerned Citizens' Voices
 The 50th anniversary of the Atomic Bombing - Hiroshima Mayor Takashi Hiraoka
 Thoughts on the Atomic Bombing's 50th Anniversary - Teruo Sanuki
 A Voice From Hiroshima - Yasuo Harada
 Hiroshima's Challenge - Takashiro Kurisu
 The Enola Gay and American Conscience: Reflections on the Smithsonian Debate - Michio Okamoto
 Judgment! Using Nuclear Arms is a crime - Teruaki Fukuhara
 The City of Hiroshima, Peace Declaration - Hiroshima Mayor Tadatoshi Akita

Chapter 3: Supportive Voices from Overseas
 Appeal for Peace - Pope John Paul II
 Call to Real Commitment - Former Prime Minister Malcolm Fraser Australia
 Heed Now Hiroshima's Lesson - Dr Oscar Arias, Costa Rica
 Dismantling Nuclear Forces - F.W. de Klerk South Africa
 Hiroshima Ad Memoria! - A.A. Bessmertnykh, Russia

Part Two: The Hiroshima Experience After 25 Years

Chapter 4 Earlier Memoirs of A-bomb Experiences
 Diary of an Atomic Bomb Survivor After 25 years - Teruo Sanuki
 Our Family's A-bomb experience - Toshio Murakami 
 That Fateful Day - Masuto Higaki
 Instant Inferno - Hitoshi Takayama
 I Hate 'Hiroshima' - Shigetoshi Wakaki
 Hiroshima What It Means To You and Me - Takuo Matsumoto
 A Memorial Tribute to Two Young Victims of the Atomic Bomb - Fumiko Ochiai
 The Appeal of a Girl Survivor - Miyoko Matsubara
 My Son Died When He Was Seven Years Old - Kenzo Nagoya
 Mother Was Exposed to the A-bomb - Junko Ryoba
 Grief for My Lost Parents - Wataru Fujimoto
 A Child Exposed In Utero - Chizuno Nagaoka
 My Life Since August 6, 1945 - Kametoshi Sakimoto
 From My Sickbed - Shizuko Nishimoto
 Mingled Feelings of Wrath and Lament - Masuo Masumiya
 The Hibakusha Are Still Suffering - Haruko Yukinari 
 Diabolic Radiation: An Elderly A-bomb Survivor's Tale of Agony - Motoichi Oride
 A Korean Survivor's Appeal - Kang Mun Hee
 Peace Education Based on A-bomb Experiences - Hiroshi Morishita

Chapter 5: Hiroshima Today
A Roundtable Conference: The Victims Speak

Voices of Hiroshima Citizens
 Message of Commendation - Hiroshima Mayor Takeshi Araki
 Peace Is The Hope of All Mankind - Kazumitsu Aihara
 Delayed Death - Tomin Harada
 Hiroshima and Humanity - Soichi Iijima
 The Role of the Hiroshima Peace Memorial Museum - Kaoru Augur
 Pearl Harbor and Hiroshima - Naomi Shohno

Chapter 6: Voices of the World
 Thoughts on the Atomic Bombing of Hiroshima - Arnold Joseph Toynbee
 A Grace Period for Turning to Peace - Alfred Kastler
 A Time For Those Who Care - Barbara Reynolds
 One World or No World - Gunther Anders
 Toward a Peaceful World Commonwealth - Janet E and AA Hook
 Hiroshima: Symbol of Fear and Hope - Imgeborg Kufter
 Scientific Experiments - Ira Morris
 Teaching Peace Without Hatred - Beate Seefeld
 This Cause Will Triumph - Philip J. Noel-Baker
 Appeals Are Futile Without Action - Anatol Rapoport
 World Opinion for Peace - Shinichiro Tomonaga
 The "New Man" of Peace - Tibor Barther

Chapter 7: Messages from Foreign Leaders
 United Nations - Kurt Waldheim
 UNESCO - Amadou-Mahtar M'Bow
 Australia - EG Whitlam
 Austria - Bruno Kreisky 
 New Zealand - Bill Rowling
 Peru - Edgardo Mercado Jarrin
 Pakistan - Anwar Ali Khoja 
 Saudi Arabia - Mohammad Al-Nowaiser
 Turkey - Suleyman Demire

References

External links
 Google Books version of 1979 edition

2000 non-fiction books
Books about the atomic bombings of Hiroshima and Nagasaki
History books about World War II